Rocky Point is a settlement in Jamaica. It has a population of 3,183 as of 2009.

Rocky Point is a small community located on the southern coast of Clarendon. 

Populated places in Clarendon Parish, Jamaica